The fascial compartments of thigh are the three fascial compartments that divide and contain the thigh muscles. The fascia lata is the strong and deep fascia of the thigh that surrounds the thigh muscles and forms the outer limits of the compartments. Internally the muscle compartments are divided by the lateral and medial intermuscular septa. 

The three groups of muscles contained in the compartments have their own nerve supply:

Compartments

See also
 Compartment syndrome
 Fascial compartments of arm

References

External links
  knee/muscles/index at the Dartmouth Medical School's Department of Anatomy

Lower limb anatomy